Wall Rock is a rock 4 nautical miles (7 km) north of Robbins Nunatak in the Schmidt Hills portion of the Neptune Range, Pensacola Mountains. Mapped by United States Geological Survey (USGS) from surveys and U.S. Navy air photos, 1956–66. Named by Advisory Committee on Antarctic Names (US-ACAN) for John Wall, a member of the Electronic Test Unit in the Pensacola Mountains, 1957–58.

Rock formations of Queen Elizabeth Land